Henry Scotland (182127 July 1910) was a member of the New Zealand Legislative Council from 24 February 1868 to 27 July 1910, when he died. He was the fourth son of George Scotland of Hornsey, Middlesex, England; he matriculated at St John's College, Oxford in 1840, and was called to the bar at the Middle Temple in 1849.

He was from the region of Taranaki in North Island.

References 

1821 births
Place of birth unknown
1910 deaths
Place of death unknown
People from Taranaki
Members of the New Zealand Legislative Council